People associated with San Sebastian College – Recoletos de Manila.

Media
Alice Dixson - actress
Bebe Gandanghari - actor/actress
Kyla (Melanie Calumpad) - singer (high school)
Jay Manalo - actor
Fernando Poe Jr. - actor (1st year-2nd year high school)
Mat Ranillo III - actor (high school)
Gladys Reyes - actress
Mccoy De Leon - cast member of the hit Philippine daytime series Be Careful With My Heart; #Hashtag male dancer on the noontime variety show It's Showtime. (high school)
Joel Recla - Radio and Television Producer and Host. Toronto Canada.
 I belong to the zoo - indie singer.

Sports
Calvin Abueva - PBA Alaska Aces player; led NCAA season 88 in points, rebounds, and assist in his final year,  NCAA season 87 MVP, NCAA season 85 Men's Basketball Champion
Rommel Adducul - 5-time NCAA champion, 3-time NCAA MVP
Ian Sangalang - PBA player, NCAA season 85 Men's Basketball Champion
Ronald Pascual - PBA player, NCAA season 85 Men's Basketball Champion
John Raymundo - PBA player, NCAA season 85 Men's Basketball Champion
Jimbo Aquino - PBA player, NCAA season 85 Men's Basketball Champion
Gilbert Bulawan - PBA player, NCAA season 85 Men's Basketball Champion
Marco Alcaraz - actor, model, basketball player
Paul Alvarez - NCAA, PBA player and actor (college)
Anthony Trinidad - HS Basketball player, Sports Fishing Ambassador 
Jason Ballesteros - basketball player, former Smart Gilas Pilipinas player
Christian Coronel - former PBA player, ABL team Philippine Patriots
Paul Lee - (high school) PBA player, PBA Rookie of the year, NCAA juniors champion
Leo Najorda - PBA player
Fernando Navarro - basketball player and coach
John Raymundo - PBA player
Topex Robinson - basketball player, former PBA player, Head Coach of San Sebastian Stags
Eric Salamat - (high school) PBA player; played for San Sebastian during his high school days; played for Ateneo in college, NCAA juniors Finals MVP
Rodney Santos - former PBA player
Johnedel Cardel - NCAA, and former PBA player 
Homer Se - former PBA player
JC Tiuseco - actor, model, basketball player; first Pinoy Sole Survivor
Zanjoe Marudo - actor, model, basketball player;

Politics

Sara Duterte - politician,  15th Vice President of the Philippines, 38th Secretary of Education,Former Mayor of Davao City (LLB)

Roilo Golez - politician
Mayor Edward Hagedorn - politician
Luis Chavit Singson - politician (high school)
Mans Carpio - Second Gentleman of the Philippines (LLB)

San Sebastian College – Recoletos
San Sebastian College - Recoletos people
San Seb
San SEb

pam:San Sebastian College - Recoletos